

Events
April 13 – Joseph Martin Kraus's Symphonie funèbre is played at the funeral of Gustavus III of Sweden.
May 16 – La Fenice in Venice is inaugurated with a performance of Giovanni Paisiello's opera I giuochi d'Agrigento.
July 11–14 – The Belfast Harp Festival in Ireland brings together and records the work of most of the remaining traditional players of the clàrsach. It is organised by Dr. James McDonnell, Robert Bradshaw and Henry Joy McCracken and Edward Bunting transcribes the music.

Bands disbanded
The Academy of Ancient Music (formed 1726)

Popular Music
"Ye brave sons of Britain" by William Parsons
"Chant de guerre pour l'armée du Rhin" aka "La Marseillaise" by Claude Joseph Rouget de Lisle

Classical Music
Claude Balbastre – Marche des Marseillois et l'air Ça-ira
Ludwig van Beethoven 
"An Laura", for voice and piano, WoO 112
"An Minna", for voice and piano, WoO 115
Rondino for oboes, clarinets, horns, and bassoons in E-flat major, WoO 25
Duo for 2 Flutes, WoO 26
Six Variations on a Swiss song for piano or harp, WoO 64
Trinklied, WoO 109
Variations on an original theme in E major for violin, cello, and piano, Op. 44
Octet for winds in E major, Op. 103
Muzio Clementi – 3 Piano Trios, Op. 28
Jan Ladislav Dussek – Piano Concerto No.4, Op. 17
Josef Gelinek – 6 Variations on 'Ein Mädchen oder Weibchen'
Joseph Haydn
Symphony No. 94
Symphony No. 97
Symphony No. 98
12 Minuets, Hob.IX:11
150 Scottish Songs, Hob.XXXIa:1–150
Johann Nepomuk Hummel – Trio for piano, violin and cello, no. 1
Joseph Martin Kraus – Symphonie funebre in C minor
Friedrich Wilhelm Pannenberg – Zwölf Sleiver und zwey Quadrille
Johann Franz Xaver Sterkel 
Symphony in D major, StWV 128
Symphony in B-flat major, StWV 129
3 Violin Sonatas, StWV 198

Opera
Maria Theresia Ahlefeldt – Telemak på Calypsos
Domenico Cimarosa – Il Matrimonio Segreto
Giuseppe Farinelli – 
Louis Emmanuel Jadin – Amélie de Montfort
Etienne Méhul – Stratonice

Methods and theory writings 

 John Wall Callcott – An Explanation of the Notes, Marks, Words, etc. Used in Music
 Johann Adam Hiller 
 Anweisung zum Violinspielen
 Kurze und erleichterte Anweisung zum Singen
 Christian Kalkbrenner – Kurzer Abriß der Geschichte der Tonkunst
 Andrew Law – The Art of Singing

Births
February 29 – Gioacchino Rossini, composer (died 1868)
March 11 – Natale Abbadia, composer (died 1861)
August 28 – Karolina Bock, singer, actress, dancer, drama teacher
October 2 – Cipriani Potter, pianist and composer (died 1871)
October 13 – Moritz Hauptmann, writer and composer (died 1868)

Deaths
February 29 – Johann Andreas Stein, maker of keyboard instruments (born 1728)
June 28 – Elizabeth Ann Linley, singer (born 1754)
June 30 – Antonio Rosetti, double bass player and composer (born c. 1750)
October 11 – Gaetano Guadagni, castrato singer (born 1728)
November 29 (or 30) – Ernst Wilhelm Wolf, composer (b. 1735)
December 15 – Joseph Martin Kraus, composer ("the Swedish Mozart") (born 1756)
December 18 – Johann van Beethoven, singer, father of Ludwig van Beethoven (born 1740)
date unknown
Giovanni Battista Casali, choir-master and choral composer (b. 1715)
Mian Ghulam Nabi Shori, composer of Hindustani classical music (b. 1742)

References

 
18th century in music
Music by year